Glittering Prize 81/92 is a compilation album by Simple Minds, released in 1992.

It spans the period from Sons and Fascination/Sister Feelings Call (the first album recorded by Simple Minds for Virgin Records) to Real Life.

The album omits the earliest period of Simple Minds' recording career, which yielded three albums released on Arista (only reissues are on Virgin).

At the time of its release, the album was promoted by the double A-side single "Love Song/Alive and Kicking", where "Love Song" appeared in a remixed form. Both "Love Song" (from 1981) and "Alive and Kicking" (from 1985) appear in their original 7-inch edits on the album.

The namesake video collection, featuring promo videos from the then latest two albums and live versions of the hits was released simultaneously.

Track listing

Europe and Canada

United States

Australia

Chart positions

Certifications

References

External links

 
 

1992 greatest hits albums
Albums produced by Steve Lillywhite
Albums produced by Trevor Horn
Albums produced by Stephen Lipson
Albums produced by Jimmy Iovine
Albums produced by Bob Clearmountain
Simple Minds compilation albums
Virgin Records compilation albums